Jameel is an Arabic given name, and a surname. Notable persons with that name include:

People with the given name Jameel
 Jameel Cook (born 1979), American football player
 Jameel Jalibi (born 1929), Pakistani linguist
 Jameel Dumas (born 1981), American football player
 Jameel Humadan, Bahraini politician
 Jameel Jaffer (born 1971), Canadian lawyer and human rights activist
 Jameel Mahmood, Indian general
 Jameel Massouh (born 1984), American mixed martial artist 
 Jameel McCline (born 1970), American boxer
 Jameel Sewell, (born 1989), American football player
 Jameel Watkins (born 1977), American basketball player

People with the surname Jameel
 Fathulla Jameel (1942–2012), Maldivian politician
 Hassan Jameel, Saudi businessman and philanthropist
 Mohamed Jameel (born 1970), Maldivian football player
 Tariq Jameel (born 1953), Pakistani Islamic scholar
 Yusuf Jameel (born 1958), Indian journalist

See also
 Jamil
 Yamil
 Jamal

References

Arabic masculine given names
Arabic-language surnames